The International Federation of Library Associations and Institutions (IFLA) is the leading international body representing the interests of people who rely on libraries and information professionals. An independent, non-governmental, not-for-profit organization, IFLA was founded in Scotland in 1927 and maintains headquarters at the National Library of the Netherlands in The Hague. IFLA sponsors the annual IFLA World Library and Information Congress, promoting universal and equitable access to information, ideas, and works of imagination for social, educational, cultural, democratic, and economic empowerment. IFLA also produces several publications, including IFLA Journal.

IFLA closely partners with UNESCO, resulting in several jointly produced manifestos.  IFLA is also a founding member of Blue Shield, which works to protect the world's cultural heritage when threatened by wars and natural disaster.

History

IFLA was founded in Edinburgh, Scotland, on 30 September 1927, when library associations from 14 European countries and the United States signed a resolution at the celebration of the 50th anniversary of the Library Association of the United Kingdom. Isak Collijn, head of the National Library of Sweden, was elected the first president. The first constitution was approved in Rome in 1929 during the World Congress of Librarianship and Bibliography.

During the 1930s the first library associations from outside Europe and the US joined, these being China, India, Japan, Mexico and the Philippines. By 1958 membership had grown to 64 associations from 42 countries. A permanent secretariat was established in 1962. By 1970 there were 250 members from 52 countries. The secretariat was moved to The Hague in 1971. By 1974 IFLA membership had become virtually global with 600 members in 100 countries.

Membership criteria were expanded beyond library associations in 1976 to include institutions, i.e. libraries, library schools and bibliographic institutes. At this time, the word Institutions was added to the organisation's name. Since then further new categories of membership have been created, including personal affiliates.

IFLA has now grown to over 1,700 members in approximately 155 countries. It is headquartered in the Koninklijke Bibliotheek, the National Library of the Netherlands, in The Hague.

In 2021 for the first time, IFLA held World Library and Information Congress (WLIC) online because of the continuing global pandemic. On 17–19 August, the virtual conference drew thousands of attendees from around the world to more than 150 sessions with topics that ranged from digital controlled lending to new skill sets for school librarians to climate impact on libraries.

Mission
"A strong and united library field powering literate, informed and participative societies."  

IFLA's objectives are:
 To represent librarianship in matters of international interest
 To promote the continuing education of library personnel
 To develop, maintain and promote guidelines for library services

Core values
The objectives are informed by the following core values:
 The endorsement of the principles of freedom of expression embodied in Article 19 of the Universal Declaration of Human Rights
 The belief that people, communities and organizations need universal and equitable access to information, ideas and works of imagination for their social, educational, cultural, democratic and economic well-being
 The conviction that delivery of high quality library and information services helps guarantee that access
 The commitment to enable all Members of the Federation to engage in, and benefit from, its activities without regard to citizenship, disability, ethnic origin, gender, geographical location, language, political philosophy, race or religion.

Divisions

According to IFLA, their "most important work ... happens in the various groups that make up the organisation".

More than 60 sections, strategic programmes, and special interest groups are organized in five divisions to carry out a variety of IFLA's activities and programs. 

These divisions are: 

 Library Types (Division I) - includes sections focused on academic, research, public, special, and school libraries; a strategic programme for Committee on Standards; and special interest groups, including Evidence for Global and Disaster Health (E4GDH) group.
 Library Collections (Division II) - includes sections on acquisitions and collection development, rare books and special collections, and news media; strategic programmes on Preservation and Conservation (PAC) and the Committee on Standards; and special interest groups on LGBTQ users and on library publishing.
 Library Services (Division III) - includes sections on Bibliography, Cataloguing, and Indigenous Matters; strategic programmes on UNIMARC and the Committee on Standards; and special interest groups on big data and Digital Humanities.
 Support of the Profession (Division IV) - includes sections on library buildings and equipment, theory and research, and statistics and evaluation; strategic programmes for the Committee on Freedom of Access to Information and Freedom of Expression (FAIFE), Committee on Copyright and other Legal Matters (CLM), and the Committee on Standards; and special interest groups including Women, Information and Libraries Special Interest Group and LIS Education in Developing Countries.
 Regions (Division V) - includes sections on Africa, Asia and Oceania, Latin America and the Caribbean; strategic programmes for the Library Development Programme (LDP) and the Committee on Standards; and special interest group for Access to Information Network – Africa (ATINA).

Strategic programmes
IFLA operates six strategic programmes:

 Committee on Standards
 Copyright and other Legal Matters (CLM) Advisory Committee
 Freedom of Access to Information and Freedom of Expression (FAIFE) Advisory Committee

 Library Development Programme (LDP)
 Strategic Programme on Preservation and Conservation (PAC)
 UNIMARC Strategic Programme.

Committee on Copyright and other Legal Matters (CLM) 
Copyright and intellectual property issues and laws have long been recognized important to the library profession. A volunteer-driven committee, the CLM was created to advise and represent IFLA on matters of international copyright law.

The CLM produces legal briefs and is the representative for IFLA at meetings of the World Intellectual Property Organization (WIPO). The CLM's activities for the WIPO involve:
 Copyright limitations and exceptions for libraries and archives
 Copyright limitations and exceptions for visually impaired persons
 Relations with WIPO Secretariat
 Opposition to the Broadcast Treaty at WIPO
 Development Agenda at WIPO
 Preservation of Traditional Knowledge at WIPO

Committee on Free Access to Information and Freedom of Expression (FAIFE)
One of the core activities of IFLA is the Committee on Free Access to Information and Freedom of Expression, which monitors the state of intellectual freedom within the library community worldwide, supports IFLA policy development and co-operation with other international human rights organisations, and responds to violations of free access to information and freedom of expression. FAIFE provides guidance and leadership on issues of intellectual freedom around the world through the publication of annual reports, guidelines, manifestos, special reports, and statements.

In 2022, the 25th anniversary of the establishment of IFLA’s Committee on Free Access to Information and Freedom of Expression, the landmark IFLA Statement on Libraries and Intellectual Freedom was the focus of a special issue of the IFLA Journal 

The mission of FAIFE is to:
 Raise awareness of the essential correlation between the library concept and the values of freedom of expression.
 Collect and disseminate documentation and aim to stimulate a dialog both within and outside the library world.
 Act as a focal point on the issue of freedom of expression, libraries and librarianship.

IFLA/FAIFE is a member of the International Freedom of Expression Exchange, a global network of non-governmental organisations that monitors freedom of expression worldwide. It is also a member of the Tunisia Monitoring Group, a coalition of 16 free expression organisations that lobbies the Tunisian government to improve its human rights record.

Library Development Program (LDP) 
Launched in 1984 and initially known as Advancement of Librarianship in the Third World, the programme has supported capacity building through a series of small grants and projects in developing and transition countries and advocacy for access to information. This program focuses predominantly on three main programs under its umbrella:
 Building Strong Library Associations Programme
 International Advocacy Programme (IAP), focusing on advocacy for the role of access to information and libraries in the UN 2030 Agenda for Sustainable Development
International Leader's Programme.

Strategic Programme on Preservation and Conservation (PAC) 
Established in 1984, the Strategic Programme on Preservation and Conservation (PAC) focuses on efforts to preserve library and archive materials, in any form, around the world. Unlike other IFLA Strategic Programmes, PAC features a decentralised approach, with global strategies implemented by a Focal Point and activities managed by Regional Centres.

PAC aims to ensure that both published and unpublished library and archive materials are preserved in an accessible form. In doing so, the programme follows three main guiding principles:
 preservation is essential to the survival and development of culture and scholarship;
 international cooperation is a key principle;
 each country must accept responsibility for the preservation of its own publications.

IFLA Trend Report
The first commissioned IFLA Trend Report, entitled "Caught in the waves or caught in the tide? Insights from the IFLA Trend Report", was published in January 2013 and launched at the World Library and Information Congress in Singapore on 19 August 2013. The IFLA Trend Report resulted in the identification of emerging high-level societal trends which may affect the global information environment. The Trend Report consists of a number of documents—including an overview, annotated bibliography and research papers—and is also intended as a web platform for ongoing consultation. In the first stage of the review from November 2012 through 2013, "social scientists, economists, business leaders, education specialists, legal experts and technologists"—mainly from outside the library field—were consulted. One of the key focal points of the report was the inundation of the archives with a tidal wave of information. By 2010 this represented more than 1 zettabytes of data or 1.8 trillion gigabytes.

The report listed five key trends predicted to impact how societies and individuals "access, use, and benefit from information in an increasingly hyper-connected world":

 new technologies that "will both expand and limit who has access to information"
 online education that "will democratise and disrupt global learning"
 redefinition of the boundaries of privacy and data protection
 hyper-connected societies that "will listen to and empower new voices and groups:
 transformation of the global information economy through new technologies

The IFLA Trend Report continues to publish annual updates on these five key trends, as well as compiling and creating further resources.

Manifestos
IFLA has endorsed and collaborated on several manifestos that cover a wide range of issues related to libraries. These manifestos include:

 IFLA/UNESCO Public Library Manifesto 1994 (1994)
 IFLA/UNESCO School Library Manifesto 1999 (1999)
 Alexandria Manifesto on Libraries, the Information Society in Action (2005)
 IFLA Manifesto on Transparency, Good Governance and Freedom from Corruption (2008)
 IFLA/UNESCO Multicultural Library Manifesto (2009)
 IFLA Library Statistics Manifesto (2010)
 IFLA/UNESCO Manifesto for Digital Libraries (2010)
 IFLA Manifesto for libraries serving persons with a print disability (2012)
 Internet Manifesto 2014 (2014)
 A Library Manifesto for Europe (2019)
 IFLA School Library Manifesto (2021)—forthcoming

Manifesto for Libraries Serving Persons with a Print Disability (LPD)
Endorsed by IFLA's Governing Board in April 2012, the first draft of the Manifesto for Libraries Serving Persons with a Print Disability was intended to support the Marrakesh VIP Treaty. After further drafts, the LPD Manifesto was passed in November 2013 at the 37th UNESCO General Conference in Paris. The LPD Manifesto encourages libraries to provide more accessible library and information services for blind and visually impaired patrons. According to the IFLA, lack of access to information is the biggest barrier for persons with a print disability to fully and effectively participate in all aspects of society.

The six statements of the LPD Manifesto are as follows:
 IFLA recommends that all library and information providers, as part of their core services, put in place services, collections, equipment and facilities, which will assist individual users with a print disability to access and use resources that meet their particular needs for information.
 IFLA encourages library and information service providers to consult individuals with a disability, and groups representing them, in the planning, development and ongoing delivery of services.
 IFLA acknowledges that the best services are provided by professionals who are aware of the needs of, and service options for, people with a print disability. Therefore, IFLA encourages all library and information services to ensure that staff are adequately trained and available to work with users with a print disability, and supports career-long professional development and formal library and information studies programs, which will facilitate the strengthening of equitable library and information services to people with a print disability.
 IFLA supports efforts to improve access to resources by people with a print disability through service agreements, referrals and sharing of resources between library and information services; and between these and other organisations specialising in services targeted for people with a print disability. Therefore, IFLA encourages the establishment and development of an international network of libraries of accessible materials.
 IFLA supports efforts to ensure that copyright legislation enables equal access by people with a print disability to information from all libraries and information providers.
 In addition to meeting legislative requirements, IFLA encourages the observation of universal design principles, guidelines and standards to ensure that library and information services, collections, technologies, equipment and facilities meet the identified needs of users with a print disability.

Jay Jordan IFLA/OCLC Early Career Development Fellowship Program
Sponsored by IFLA and OCLC, the Jay Jordan IFLA/OCLC Early Career Development Fellowship Program "provides early career development and continuing education for library and information science professionals from countries with developing economies." Each year, the four-week program provides up to five individuals with the opportunity to interact with important information practitioners in the field. Additionally, the Fellows deliver presentations that grapple with libraries' challenges and formulate development plans that benefit their personal career growth.

IFLA/OCLC Fellows by Year

President
The current president of IFLA is Barbara Lison.

Publications
 IFLA Journal is an academic journal in the fields of libraries, library and information science, and freedom of information published quarterly by SAGE Publication on behalf of IFLA
 IFLA Publications Series
 IFLA Series on Bibliographic Control
 IFLA Professional Reports

See also
 Public library ratings
 Coordinating Council of Audiovisual Archives Association
 UNESCO Public Library Manifesto

References

External links

1927 establishments in Scotland
International organisations based in the Netherlands
Library associations
Members of the International Council for Science
Organizations established in 1927
World Digital Library partners
Members of the International Science Council